Werner Biskup (26 April 1942 – 22 June 2014) was a German professional football player and manager, who played as a defender.

References

1942 births
2014 deaths
German footballers
Bayer 04 Leverkusen players
Fortuna Düsseldorf players
1. FC Köln players
RFC Liège players
Association football defenders
Bundesliga players
German expatriate footballers
Expatriate footballers in Belgium
German expatriate sportspeople in Belgium
German football managers
RFC Liège managers
SC Preußen Münster managers
VfL Osnabrück managers
KFC Uerdingen 05 managers
Hannover 96 managers
SV Arminia Hannover managers
KSV Hessen Kassel managers
Trabzonspor managers
BV Cloppenburg managers
German expatriate football managers
Expatriate football managers in Belgium
Expatriate football managers in Turkey
German expatriate sportspeople in Turkey
People from Bottrop
Footballers from North Rhine-Westphalia
Sportspeople from Münster (region)